Nagpuria (or Nagpuriya) is spoken in the Rudraprayag district of Uttarakhand state. Currently it has been classified as a dialect under Garhwali, belonging to the Central Pahari group(as per Grierson).

Lexical similarity with neighbors

Grammar

Script & specimen

References 

Northern Indo-Aryan languages
Endangered languages of India
Languages of Uttarakhand